Dornblaser Field is the name of two outdoor athletic stadiums in the western United States, located in Missoula, Montana.

The first ivy-covered stone venue opened  in 1912 on campus at the base of Mount Sentinel and east of University Hall.  Its southwestern portion is now the location of the Mansfield Library, completed in 1978. It hosted the Griz until an off-campus stadium opened in 1968, a "temporary" stadium about a mile (1.6 km) southwest which held 12,500 spectators in steel and wood bleachers. The second stadium was replaced for football when Washington–Grizzly Stadium opened in October 1986, back on campus, east of Dahlberg Arena.

The Campbell ballpark for baseball was adjacent to the north end of Dornblaser and aligned southeast (home plate to center field); the Grizzly baseball program was dropped after the 1972 season.

Recently renovated, Dornblaser Field continues as the home venue for the Grizzlies' track and field teams.

References

External links
 Dornblaser Field Photograph Album (University of Montana Archives)

Defunct college football venues
Montana Grizzlies football
Buildings and facilities of the University of Montana
Sports venues in Missoula, Montana
American football venues in Montana
1912 establishments in Montana
Soccer venues in Montana
Sports venues completed in 1912
University and college buildings completed in 1912